The 2009 Phillip Island Superbike World Championship round was the first round of the 2009 Superbike World Championship. It took place over the weekend of 27 February–1 March 2009, at the Phillip Island Grand Prix Circuit near Cowes, Victoria, Australia.

Results

Superbike race 1

Superbike race 2

Supersport race

References
 Superbike Race 1
 Superbike Race 2
 Supersport Race

External links
 The official website of the Phillip Island Grand Prix Circuit
 The official website of the Superbike World Championship

Philip Island
Motorsport at Phillip Island
Superbike World Championship round
Superbike
Superbike